Friedrich Gustav Arvelius (16/5 February 1753 – 25/13 July 1806) was a theologian, pedagogue, playwright and poet living in Estonia. He was of Finnish and Baltic-German origin. His pseudonym was Sembard.

References

External links
 Friedrich Gustav Arvelius at Estonian Writers' Online Dictionary

Estonian male poets
Year of birth uncertain
Writers from Tallinn